The 1990 Panay earthquake occurred at 3:41 p.m. local time on 14 June 1990 with a moment magnitude of 7.1 in the Richter scale, leaving eight dead and 41 others injured. The epicenter was located at Culasi, Antique on Panay Island in the Philippines. The depth was computed to be 15 kilometers. It was generated by fault movement in the collisional zone off western Panay Island.

Earthquake
The 7.1 magnitude earthquake was registered at 3:41 p.m. by the Philippine Institute of Volcanology and Seismology (PHIVOLCS) and determined it to be of tectonic origin. The depth of focus was measured at 15 kilometers (9 miles) and its epicenter was located in the vicinity of Culasi, Antique. However, the United States Geological Survey (USGS) recorded the depth of focus of the earthquake at 18 kilometers (11.2 miles), deeper than what is recorded by PHIVOLCS.

Impact

Antique
In Culasi, the earthquake's epicenter, seven  people were killed and 31 others suffered injuries. Several residential and commercial buildings collapsed and were damaged. Four bridges collapsed. Fissures were recorded in two barangays. In Barangay Bagacay, an upliftment occurred. Landslides also occurred along the slope of Mt. Madya-as.

Aklan
In Libacao, some residential buildings were totally damaged, while some were damaged. Two churches and a river control project were heavily damaged and five highway bridges were partially damaged.

In Balete, the Baptist church and the public market were heavily damaged, while an icon was toppled down. The Rural Health Center and a rice mill collapsed. The Balete District Hospital was badly damaged and was declared dangerous for future use. Another public market and some bridges suffered partial damage. A residential house collapsed, while others were partially damaged. In Jaro River, a fissure occurred.

In Madalag, the municipal and district hospital sustained some cracks.

In Kalibo, the Aklan Science High School and Alan Cinema were partially damaged. The Catholic Church of Kalibo that is made of bricks suffered cracks on its walls. A house made of ceramics was damaged.

In Numancia, a sandboil was observed.

In Altavas, the wharf was damaged. Some cracks were recorded on the walls of the Cathedral, while the head of an icon was damaged.

In Makato, the sports complex was damaged. The posts and beams of the public market were also damaged.

Iloilo 
In Calinog, various buildings of the Philippine Constabulary Regional Command were damaged. The Catholic Church was partially damaged.

Capiz 
In Cuartero, a church and several houses were damaged.

In Sigma, a bridge and a communication tower were damaged.

See also
1990 Luzon earthquake
1948 Lady Caycay earthquake
List of earthquakes in 1990
List of earthquakes in the Philippines

References

Earthquakes in the Philippines
1990 disasters in the Philippines
1990 earthquakes
June 1990 events in Asia